Bradley Michael Jackson (born January 11, 1975 in Canton, Ohio) is a former linebacker in the National Football League. He grew up in Anaheim, California and Akron, Ohio.  He played six seasons in the NFL, from 1998–2003, for the Baltimore Ravens and the Carolina Panthers. He played high school football for the Firestone Falcons in Akron, OH.

He played both college football and college basketball at the University of Cincinnati, where he was coached by current West Virginia Men's Basketball Head Coach Bob Huggins. He is the 3rd all-time leading tackler in school history. He was drafted in the 3rd round, 79th overall, in the 1998 NFL Draft by the Miami Dolphins.

Jackson participated in the NFL Minority Coaching Fellowship Program with the Indianapolis Colts in 2007 and the Atlanta Falcons in 2010.

He has been a studio analyst for Comcast SportsNet Mid-Atlantic since the inception of its live Baltimore Ravens programming in September 2011. His assignments include Ravens Kickoff and Ravens Postgame Live on gameday and SportsNet Central: John Harbaugh Live the following day.

References

1975 births
Living people
Players of American football from Canton, Ohio
American football linebackers
Cincinnati Bearcats football players
Miami Dolphins players
Baltimore Ravens players
Carolina Panthers players